Eik Satellite Earth Station is a radiocommunication site located in Moi a small town in Rogaland county in Norway. The ground earth station is owned by Apax Partners, after it was sold by its previous owner Telenor. Eik Earth Station is one of the 29 ground stations used by the International Maritime Satellite Communicaton System. The ground station is also a part of the Inmarsat C system, being one of the earth stations used in the Inmarsat C maritime communications system. The Norwegian Meteorological Institute also uses the earth station for direct access to european and american weather satellites.

Statistics 
Eik earth station consists of two parts; the main satellite dish, and an unmanned remote antenna site linked to and controlled by the main Eik Inmarsat Earth Station via fibre-optic cables. This location allows a view of satellites otherwise not available from the main Eik station due to local geography.

Dimensions 
Although exact measurements are not readily available we do know that both the remote and the main Eik station dishes are more than 9meters in diameter (29 ft 6in), due to the requirement set by Inmarsat.

References